Matbucha }} maṭbūkhah) is a Moroccan Sephardi cuisine condiment or cooked salad consisting of cooked tomatoes and roasted bell peppers seasoned with garlic and chili pepper, and slow-cooked for a number of hours.   It is traditionally served on Shabbat with challah or "home bread" (a traditional Moroccan bread just for serving with matbucha), and is a condiment typically served as part of an appetizer, often as part of a salatim, or salad course.

It may be used as a base for shakshuka.

Preparation

Matbucha is prepared by cooking tomatoes, bell peppers, chilis and garlic over low heat for many hours until they cook down into a smooth, thick spread similar to jam in consistency.

Commercial variants

Commercially-produced matbucha has been commonly sold throughout Israel at most grocery stores for decades, and is available in both the refrigerated and shelf stable varieties. Brands include Sabra, Osem, and others. In recent years matbucha has become available in the United States under the NY Shuk brand, among several others.

See also
 List of Jewish cuisine dishes
 Israeli cuisine
 Jewish cuisine
 Shakshuka, a similar dish with eggs
 List of Moroccan dishes

References

Appetizers
Israeli cuisine
Mizrahi Jewish cuisine
Moroccan cuisine
Condiments
Salads
Sephardi Jewish cuisine